The Vote is a 2015 play by British playwright James Graham. The play received its world premiere at the Donmar Warehouse as part of their spring 2015 season, where it ran from 24 April to 7 May 2015. Directed by Josie Rourke and set in a fictitious London polling station on election night 2015, the play was broadcast live on UK television channel More4 on the night of the election.

In 2019, the play was updated into a rehearsed reading production for that year's general election.

Production history
The Vote was written by playwright James Graham. On 3 November 2014, it was announced the play would premiere as part of the Donmar Warehouse's spring 2015 season and would begin previews at the Donmar Warehouse, London on 24 April with an official opening, and final night on 7 May 2015. Tickets for the play's short run were made available through a ballot. In addition to its theatre showing, a live broadcast of the play aired on the UK television channel More4 on the night of the election.
The Vote is set in a polling station in Lambeth, during the final 90 minutes of polling for the 2015 general election on 7 May 2015, meaning it was the first ever play broadcast live at the exact time it was set. The broadcast attracted 555,000 viewers at its peak, making it the most viewed production in the history of the Donmar Warehouse. The broadcast was filmed using fixed-rig cameras, similar to those used in television shows such as One Born Every Minute, rather than conventional filming methods.The play was directed by Josie Rourke, with design by Robert Jones, lighting design by Oliver Fenwick, movement by Stephen Mear, composition by Michael Bruce and sound design by Nick Lidster. The work which had been in development for a year previous reunited the Donmar Warehouse's artistic director Rourke with writer James Graham, who last worked together on the play Privacy, which also premiered at the Donmar.

The play featured an ensemble cast of around 40, including Catherine Tate, Mark Gatiss, Timothy West, Nina Sosanya and Bill Paterson. Judi Dench also starred alongside her real life daughter Finty Williams for the first time, playing a mother and daughter and marking her first performance at the theatre since 1976.

A typical performance ran 90 minutes, with no interval.

Describing the live broadcast, director Rourke said, "This is a unique opportunity for the Donmar to make a small theatre feel very big", whilst writer Graham added that he hoped to illuminate the "diverse, diligent and often hilarious individuals" who turn the "unglamourous" settings of polling stations into "places where history is made".

In 2019, the play was updated into a one-off rehearsed reading production for that year's general election, held on 12 December at Bush House. All the original cast members reprised their roles, with the exception of Judi Dench, Timothy West, Bhasker Patel, Kadiff Kirwan, Alice Hewkin, Madalena Alberto and Chukwudi Iwuji, who were respectively replaced by Susan Brown, Gawn Grainger, Sartaj Garewal, Calvin Demba, Shaofan Wilson, Lisa Caruccio Came and Nonso Anozie. James Graham himself read out the lines of Catherine Tate's character's brother, Colin Henderson, while Simon Russell Beale was the narrator. Rourke said that putting the show in 2015 was the most fun she's ever had in a theatre, adding that "it's glorious to bring so many of these actors back together, and I hope it's a reunion that becomes a tradition."

Cast

Main cast 
 Mark Gatiss as Steven Crosswell, a presiding officer of the polling station
 Catherine Tate as Kirsty Henderson, a poll clerk
 Nina Sosanya as Laura Williams, a poll clerk

Supporting cast 
As listed in order of speaking on the Donmar Warehouse's website.

Cameo appearance 
The cameo role of Kirsty's sibling, Colin/Coleen Henderson, was played by a different guest actor at each performance.

References

2015 plays
2015 television films
2015 in British television
2015 United Kingdom general election
English political plays
Works set in the 2010s
Plays set in London
Works about elections
Plays by James Graham